Tyndal Road is a small community in the Canadian province of Nova Scotia, located  in Cumberland County, Nova Scotia.

References
Tyndal Road on Destination Nova Scotia

Communities in Cumberland County, Nova Scotia